Soft Lights is an album by the saxophonist Houston Person, recorded in 1999 and released on the HighNote label.

Reception

In his review on AllMusic, Stewart Mason states: "As always with Person, the standards win. This isn't a bad place to start for those wondering which album from this era to get".

Track listing 
 "Here's That Rainy Day" (Jimmy Van Heusen, Johnny Burke) – 5:07
 "I Only Have Eyes for You" (Harry Warren, Al Dubin) – 4:37
 "It Might as Well Be Spring" (Richard Rodgers, Oscar Hammerstein II) – 6:08
 "Do Nothin' Till You Hear from Me" (Duke Ellingtonl Bob Russell) – 5:51
 "At Last" (Warren, Mack Gordon) – 7:01
 "The Night We Called It a Day" (Matt Dennis, Tom Adair) – 7:56
 "It Shouldn't Happen to a Dream" (Ellington, Don George, Johnny Hodges) – 8:47
 "I'll Be Around" (Alec Wilder) – 5:59
 "Hey There" (Jerry Ross, Richard Adler) – 6:16
 "If" (David Gates) – 5:21

Personnel 
Houston Person – tenor saxophone
Richard Wyands – piano
Russell Malone – guitar
Ray Drummond – bass
Grady Tate – drums

References 

Houston Person albums
1999 albums
HighNote Records albums
Albums recorded at Van Gelder Studio